Furlanetto is a surname. Notable people with the surname include:

 Ferruccio Furlanetto (born 1949), Italian bass
 Bonaventura Furlanetto, (17381817), Italian composer and music teacher
 Vanesa Furlanetto (born 1987), Argentine former tennis player
 Valentino Furlanetto (born 1965), former international speedway rider from Italy